"Monster" is a song by South Korean–Chinese boy band Exo, released on June 9, 2016, as the second single from their third studio album Ex'Act. It was released in both Korean and Chinese versions by their label SM Entertainment.

Background and release

Composed and arranged by Kenzie, LDN Noise, and Rodnae "Chikk" Bell, with the Korean lyrics written by Kenzie and Deepflow and the Chinese lyrics written by Kevin Yi, "Monster" is described as a "dark and intense" medium-tempo dance song with lyrics about a man's "excessive fixation on his lover". The song served as one of the "double title tracks" for Ex'Act, the other being "Lucky One", and was released together with the album on June 9, 2016. Exo began performing the song on South Korean music TV shows on the same day.

Music videos
The Korean and Chinese music videos for "Monster" were released one hour after the song itself. Apart from Exo's performances of the song at various settings, the videos also depict the members as rebels that were eventually captured but ultimately released from a prisoner transport vehicle by Baekhyun, who has been disguised as the driver. The Korean version was the fourth most-watched K-pop music video on YouTube in 2016. An additional music video exclusively showcasing the song's choreography was released on June 15, 2016.

On June 8, 2018, the Korean music video exceeded 200 million views on YouTube, and on November 13, 2019 it exceeded 300 million, becoming their first music video to achieve both milestones.

Reception
"Monster" topped both South Korea's Gaon Digital Chart and the Billboard World Digital Songs chart, becoming Exo's first number one on the latter. The song won first place nine times in total on South Korean weekly music TV shows, and was the most awarded song by a boy group in 2016. It was nominated for Song of the Year at the 18th Mnet Asian Music Awards, and was named the second and third best K-pop songs of 2016 by Dazed and Billboard respectively.

Charts

Weekly charts

Year-end charts

Sales

Release history

Credits and personnel 
Credits adapted from album's liner notes.

Studio 

 SM Blue Cup Studio – recording 
 SM Big Shot Studio – digital editing
 SM Yellow Tail Studio – mixing
 Sound Pool Studio – recording
 Ingrid Studio – recording
 Sterling Sound – mastering

Personnel 

 SM Entertainment – executive producer
 Lee Soo-man – producer
 EXO – vocals
 D.O. – background vocals
 Chen – background vocals
 Chanyeol – background vocals
 Kenzie – producer, Korean lyrics, composition, arrangement, vocal directing
 Deepflow – Korean lyrics
 Kevin Yi – Chinese lyrics
 MQ – vocal directing
 Rodnae "Chikk" Bell – composition, arrangement, background vocals
 LDN Noise – producer, composition, arrangement
 Jung Eui-seok – recording
 Jung Ho-jin – recording
 Jung Eun-kyung – recording
 Lee Min-gyu – digital editing
 Gu Jong-pil – mixing
 Tom Coyne – mastering

References

Exo songs
Korean-language songs
Chinese-language songs
2016 singles
2016 songs
SM Entertainment singles
Songs written by Kenzie (songwriter)
Gaon Digital Chart number-one singles
Songs written by Hayden Chapman
Songs written by Greg Bonnick
Song recordings produced by LDN Noise